Dave's Picks Volume 15 is a three-CD live album by the rock band the Grateful Dead.  It contains the complete concert recorded on April 22, 1978 at the Municipal Auditorium in Nashville, Tennessee. It was released on August 1, 2015 as a limited edition of 16,500 numbered copies.

One track from the previous concert of the tour ("Stella Blue"), in Lexington, Kentucky, on April 21, 1978, had been released on So Many Roads. The following concert date of the tour (April 24, 1978, Illinois State University) had been released as Dave's Picks Volume 7.

Critical reception
Stephen Thomas Erlewine, writing on AllMusic, said, "In his brief liner notes for his 15th pick, historian/vaultmaster Dave Lemieux claims April 24, 1978 as the dividing point between the tightly honed 1977 Dead and the looser 1978 Dead. That April 24 concert at Normal's Illinois State University saw release in 2013 as the seventh Dave's Pick, but this 2015 release captures a show at Nashville Municipal Auditorium from just two days earlier, so it follows that the Dead are in similarly fine form.... All and all, it's a really good, surprisingly energetic show."

Track listing
Disc 1
First set:
"Bertha" > (Jerry Garcia, Robert Hunter) – 7:27
"Good Lovin'" (Arthur Resnick, Rudy Clark) – 6:48
"Candyman" (Garcia, Hunter) – 7:26
"Looks Like Rain" (Bob Weir, John Barlow) – 8:16
"Tennessee Jed" (Garcia, Hunter) – 9:33
"Jack Straw" (Weir, Hunter) – 6:12
"Peggy-O" (traditional, arranged by Grateful Dead) – 8:16
"New Minglewood Blues" (traditional, arranged by Grateful Dead) – 6:12
"Deal" (Garcia, Hunter) – 7:24
Disc 2
Second set:
"Lazy Lightning" > (Weir, Barlow) – 3:38
"Supplication" (Weir, Barlow) – 6:42
"It Must Have Been the Roses" (Hunter) – 8:22
"Estimated Prophet" > (Weir, Barlow) – 12:36
"Eyes of the World" > (Garcia, Hunter) – 12:25
"Rhythm Devils" > (Mickey Hart, Bill Kreutzmann) – 14:09
Disc 3
"Not Fade Away" > (Norman Petty, Charles Hardin) – 11:20
"Wharf Rat" > (Garcia, Hunter) – 12:06
"Sugar Magnolia" (Weir, Hunter) – 10:07
Encore:
"One More Saturday Night" (Weir) – 5:12

Personnel
Grateful Dead
Jerry Garcia – guitar, vocals
Donna Jean Godchaux – vocals
Keith Godchaux – keyboards
Mickey Hart – drums, percussion
Bill Kreutzmann – drums, percussion
Phil Lesh – bass, vocals
Bob Weir – guitar, vocals
Production
Produced by Grateful Dead
Produced for release by David Lemieux
Executive producer: Mark Pinkus
Associate producers: Doran Tyson, Ivette Ramos
CD mastering: Jeffrey Norman
Recording: Betty Cantor-Jackson
Art direction, design: Steve Vance
Cover art: Micah Nelson
Photos: James R. Anderson
Tape research: Michael Wesley Johnson
Archival research: Nicholas Meriwether
Liner notes: David Lemieux

References

2015 live albums
15
Rhino Entertainment live albums